Khana was a Bengali poet and legendary astrologer, who composed in the medieval Bengali language between the ninth and 12th centuries AD. She is associated with the village Deulia (Chandraketugarh, near Berachampa), in present-day Barasat, North 24 parganas district, West Bengal.

Her poetry, known as Khanar Bachan (or vachan) (meaning 'khana's words'), among the earliest compositions in Bengali literature, is known for its agricultural themes.  The short couplets or quatrains reflect a robust common sense, as in this paean to industry:
thakte balad na kare chas
tar dukhkha baro mas
"He who owns oxen, but does not plough, his sorry state lasts twelve months of the year."

Legend

The legend of Khana (also named Lilavati elsewhere) centers around her association with Pragjyotishpur (the Bengal/Assam border), or possibly Chandraketugarh in southern Bengal (where a mound has been discovered amongst ruins with the names of Khana and Mihir associated with it) and that she was the daughter-in-law of the famous astronomer and mathematician, Varahamihira, a jewel among Chandragupta II Vikramaditya's famed Navaratna sabha.

Daivajna Varāhamihir (505–587), also called Varaha or Mihira, was an Indian astronomer, mathematician, and astrologer born in Ujjain (or Bengal, according to some legends). The Indian Parliament building contains pictures of Varahamihira and Aryabhata, among other astronomers.  Though little is known about his life, he supposedly hailed from South Bengal, where in the ruins of Chandraketugarh there is a mound called the mound of Khana and Mihir. Khana was the daughter-in-law of Varaha and a famous astrologer herself.

In all likelihood, she lived her life in Bengal, but a number of legends have grown up around her life.  According to one legend, she was born in Sri Lanka and was married to the mathematician-astronomer Varahamihira, but it is far more widely believed that Khana was Varahamihira's daughter-in-law, and an accomplished astrologer, becoming thereby a potential threat to Varahamihira's scientific career. However, she exceeded him in the accuracy of her predictions, and at some point, either her husband (or father-in-law) or a hired hand (or possibly Khana herself under great duress) cut off her tongue to silence her prodigious talent. This is a theme that resonates in modern Bengali feminism, as in this poem by Mallika Sengupta, khanaa's song: 
 Listen o listen :
 Hark this tale of Khanaa

 In Bengal in the Middle ages
 Lived a woman Khanaa, I sing her life
 The first Bengali woman poet
 Her tongue they severed with a knife
   - Mallika Sengupta, Amra lasya amra larai, tr. Amitabha Mukerjee
Shrii P.R. Sarkar writes about her:"Based on the all-pervasive influence of the celestial bodies, a branch of knowledge arose in day-to-day life. And this branch of knowledge was beautifully nurtured, with all its flowers, leaves and twigs, by Kshana, a beloved daughter of Ráŕh, the offspring of the Ráŕhii Vaidyas caste of Bankura /Senbhum."

Through the centuries, Khana's advice has acquired the character of an oracle in rural Bengal (modern West Bengal, Bangladesh and parts of Bihar). Ancient versions in Assamese and Oriya also exist. Advice such as "A little bit of salt, a little bit of bitter, and always stop before you are too full" is considered timeless.

Popular culture
On 15 June 2009, Indian-Bengali television channel Zee Bangla started to telecast a TV serial called Khona based on the life of Khana. The show follows the legend that states she was born and thereby lived in 'Sinhal' (Sri Lanka).

In 2019, Colors Bangla channel started a new serial named Khanar Bachan based on Khana's words and her conflicts with her father-in-law Varaha.

References

Medieval Indian poets
Hindu poets
Ancient Indian philosophers
Hindu philosophers and theologians
Ancient Asian women writers
Bengali female poets
Indian women poets
Women religious writers
Indian women philosophers
People from Barasat
Women writers from West Bengal
Indian astrologers
Ancient astrologers
Scholars from West Bengal